WKDP-FM (99.5 FM) is a radio station broadcasting a country music format.  Licensed to Corbin, Kentucky, United States, the station is currently owned by Eubanks Broadcasting, Inc. and features programming from ABC Radio .

History
The station signed on the air as WYGO-FM on August 14, 1978, with a MOR format. The format was upgraded to adult contemporary in 1984. On March 6, 1989, the station changed its call sign to the current WKDP and dropped its adult contemporary format for its current country format.

As of 1989, the station simulcast its AM sister with a country music format.

References

External links

KDP-FM
Radio stations established in 1978
1978 establishments in Kentucky
Corbin, Kentucky